Memorial Recreation Park is an athletic and recreation complex in Port Huron, Michigan. The main facility of the complex is a 5,500-seat stadium, home to the Port Huron Northern High School and Port Huron High School football teams. In addition, there are in the  complex tennis courts, four baseball fields, four softball fields, several football fields, and a quarter-mile track.

The complex was built in 1945 and is dedicated to the men and women of Port Huron who served in World War II.

References

Sports venues in Michigan
American football venues in Michigan
Athletics (track and field) venues in Michigan
Baseball venues in Michigan
High school football venues in the United States
Softball venues in the United States
Tennis venues in the United States
Sports venues completed in 1945
1945 establishments in Michigan